Mhlangana (died 1828) (also known as  Umhlangana  ka Senzangakhona) was a Zulu prince - the son of Senzangakhona, a brother of Shaka, and half-brother of Dingane and Mpande. He assisted Dingane and Shaka's induna (advisor) Mbopha in Shaka's assassination at Dukuza in 1828, and was himself assassinated by Dingane shortly afterwards.

See also
List of Zulu kings

1828 deaths
Zulu royalty
19th-century African people
Regicides
Year of birth unknown
1828 murders in Africa
19th-century murders in South Africa